The 2011 MAC Championship Game was a college football game played at 7:00 p.m. on Friday, December 2, 2011, at Ford Field in Detroit, Michigan, USA, to determine the 2011 champion of the Mid-American Conference (MAC). The game featured the Ohio Bobcats and the Northern Illinois Huskies. Sponsored by Marathon the game officially known as the "Marathon MAC Championship Game". Northern Illinois tied the record for their largest comeback in the school's history, coming back from down 20-0 to win 23-20 on the game's final play to win their second MAC championship of all time.

Teams

Ohio Bobcats

Coming into the conference championship game, the Ohio Bobcats owned a 9-3 record, including a five-game win streak including conference wins over Kent State, Akron, Central Michigan, Bowling Green, and Miami (Ohio). The Bobcats also started the season with three straight wins, before losing three games in four weeks to Rutgers, Buffalo, and Ball State.

Northern Illinois Huskies
The Huskies came into the game having won seven straight contests beforehand, giving them a 9-3 record. NIU started the season with a thrilling win over Army before losing back-to-back games to Power-5 opponents Kansas and Wisconsin. The Huskies final loss of the season, and only conference loss came two weeks later against Central Michigan on October 1. The Huskies also had MAC Vern Smith League MVP Chandler Harnish quarterbacking their offense.

Game summary

Statistics

See also
List of Mid-American Conference football champions
Mid-American Conference football individual awards

References

Championship Game
MAC Championship Game
Northern Illinois Huskies football games
Ohio Bobcats football games
American football competitions in Detroit
December 2011 sports events in the United States
MAC Championship
2011 in Detroit